State Route 283 (SR 283) is a north–south state highway in the Sequatchie Valley of southwestern East Tennessee.

Route description

SR 283 begins as a primary highway in Marion County in the southern part of Whitwell at an intersection with SR 28. It travels east to cross the Sequatchie River to leave Whitwell and travels through rural areas. The highway then enters Powells Crossroads and has an intersection with SR 27 at the center of town. SR 283 then turns secondary and turns northward to leave Powells Crossroads. It continues north through farmland to cross into Sequatchie County. It continues northeast, now running parallel to the Sequatchie River, for several miles before coming to an end at an intersection with US 127/SR 8 just south of Dunlap.

Major intersections

References

283
Transportation in Marion County, Tennessee
Transportation in Sequatchie County, Tennessee